The women's 1500 metres competition in short track speed skating at the 2022 Winter Olympics was held on 16 February, at the Capital Indoor Stadium in Beijing. Choi Min-jeong of South Korea, the defending champion, won the event. Arianna Fontana of Italy won the silver medal, and Suzanne Schulting of the Netherlands bronze.

The silver medalist, Li Jinyu, did not compete. The bronze medalist, Kim Boutin, qualified. Schulting was the 2021 World Short Track Speed Skating champion at all distances, including 1500 m. Courtney Sarault and Xandra Velzeboer were the silver and bronze medalists, respectively. Many top athletes did not participate in the championship, however. Lee Yu-bin was leading the 2021–22 ISU Short Track Speed Skating World Cup at the 1500 m distance with four races completed before the Olympics, followed by Schulting and Sarault.

Qualification

Countries were assigned quotas based on their performance during the 2021–22 ISU Short Track Speed Skating World Cup, with the top 36 athletes (maximum of three per country qualifying quotas. If a NOC declined a quota spot, it was distributed to the next available athlete, only if the maximum quota of 56 athletes per gender was not surpassed.

Records
Prior to this competition, the existing world and Olympic records were as follows.

The following records were set during the competition.

Results

Quarterfinals

Semifinals

Finals

Final B

Final A

References

Women's short track speed skating at the 2022 Winter Olympics